Devil Mountain Lakes (Inupiaq: Qitiqłiik) is a maar (a form of crater lake) in the western part of Alaska. The lake is considered to be the largest maar in the world and is part of the Espenberg volcanic field.

Geography

There are several maars the Killeak Lakes (North Killeak maar and South Killeak maar) and White Fish Lake (Whitefish Maar) close by and the area is sometimes also called Espenberg Maars.

History
The lake was probably shaped during volcanic eruptions about 21,000 years ago during the Pleistocene Ice Age as lava flows came through the permafrost creating violent underground explosions.

On December 1, 1978 the nature reserve was established as "Bering Land Bridge National Monument" changing the name on December 2, 1980 to "Bering Land Bridge National Preserve".

See also
Devil Mountain

References

External links
 About Devil Mountain Lakes  - University of Alaska System
 Map of Devil Mountain Lakes - University of Texas
 Devil Mountain Lakes - National Park Service

Bodies of water of Nome Census Area, Alaska
Lakes of Alaska
Maars of Alaska
Bodies of water of the Seward Peninsula